The Female Eye Film Festival (FeFF) is a competitive international film festival established in 2001. It is Toronto’s only international film festival geared specifically for women directors.

History  
In 2001, Female Eye Film Festival was established and incorporated as a provincial not-for-profit organization in Toronto, Canada by founder and artistic director Leslie-Ann Coles, after she observed that women directors were a minority among filmmakers at the international film festivals she attended with her debut film, In The Refrigerator. Coles originally selected for FeFF the tagline, "FeFF flicks, not just for chicks", to underline that women-made films are not necessarily just for women. In 2005, the tagline "Always Honest, Not Always Pretty" was coined, when Coles was asked to describe the festival offering. The inaugural festival took place a year later, at which 42 films were screened, mostly by local directors. Between 2002-2004, the festival began introducing programs to promote filmmaking by and about women, including the Script Development Program and the December 6 Program, in memory of the Montreal Massacre, featuring films that pertain to global issues of violence against women. 

In 2005, the festival became competitive, presenting awards for several categories of best film and best screenplay. Later, a photo exhibition and Experimental Film Program were also introduced, as well as opening and closing galas. As part of its outreach efforts, FeFF curates programs, especially of Canadian women filmmakers, for various international festivals, such as KIN International Women's Film Festival in Yerevan, Armenia, Flying Broom International Women's Film Festival in Ankara, Turkey, and  Doctober, a month long festival in Bellingham, Washington (US).

The festival has grown into a well-known and well-respected international event: In the first year, 42 films were screened from 100 submissions, 70 percent local; in 2016, there were more than 500 submissions, and more than 90 films screened over 6 days, from all around the world.

FeFF is accredited by the Canadian Academy of Film and Television. It has been voted as one of the "top 50 film festivals in the world worthy the entry fee" by the independent Movie Maker magazine six times (2013-2018), and is included in Film Daily's list of "The 10 best female-focused film festivals".

Programs 
 Script Development Program: Open to both men and women, but the script must include a woman protagonist. It is a 3-tiered program, which includes:
 Good To Go: pitch session for screenwriters with scripts that are good to go
 Script Reading Series: ACTRA members read main scenes from scripts selected
 Script reading in front of a live audience including industry delegates who provide feedback to the writers
 Young Filmmaker Development Workshop
 December 6 Program
 Experimental Film Program
 The Aboriginal Filmmaker Program

Awards 
Award winners are presented with a hand-crafted engraved statuette. Awards presented include:
 Film awards
 Best of Show
 Best Foreign Feature
 Best Canadian Feature
 Best Documentary
 Best Short Documentary 
 Best Debut Filmmaker
 Best Short Film
 Best Animation
 Best Experimental Film
 Screenplay awards
 Best Screenplay
 Best Reserve
 Best Low-Budget Feature
 Best Fresh Voice
 Audience Choice
 Other
 Winner of the Live Pitch wins a $2500 cash prize

See also 
 List of women's film festivals

References

External links 
 

Women's film festivals in Canada
Film festivals in Toronto
Film festivals established in 2001
Women in Ontario